Lev Osipovich Alburt (born August 21, 1945) is a chess Grandmaster, writer and coach. He was born  in Orenburg, Russia, and became three-time Ukrainian Champion. After defecting to the United States in 1979, he became three-time U.S. Champion.

Chess career
Alburt won the Ukrainian Chess Championship in 1972, 1973 and 1974. He earned the International Master title in 1976, and became a Grandmaster in 1977.

He defected to the United States in 1979, staying for several months with his former coach and fellow Ukrainian chess player and chess journalist Michael Faynberg. In 1980, Alburt led the U.S. Chess Olympiad team at Malta.

Alburt won the U.S. Chess Championship in 1984, 1985 and 1990, and the U.S. Open Chess Championship in 1987 and 1989. In 1986, he drew an eight-game match with the British Chess Champion, Jonathan Speelman.

Notable games 

In the 1990 U.S. Championship en route to winning the championship a third time, Alburt defeated four-time U.S. champion Yasser Seirawan with the black pieces: 
Seirawan vs. Alburt 1.d4 Nf6 2.Nf3 c5 3.c3 d5 4.Bf4 e6 5.e3 Bd6 6.Bb5+ Nc6 7.Qa4 Bxf4 8.exf4 Qb6 9.Nbd2 0-0 10.dxc5 Qxc5 11.0-0 Bd7 12.Bxc6 bxc6 13.Qd4 Qe7 14.b4 c5 15.bxc5 Rfc8 16.Nb3 a5 17.Rfc1 a4 18.Nbd2 Qxc5 19.c4 Rab8 20.Qxc5 Rxc5 21.Ne5 Rcc8 22.Rab1 Kf8 23.a3 Ke7 24.g3 Rxb1 25.Rxb1 Rc7 26.Kf1 Be8 27.Ke1 h5 28.f3 Nd7 29.Nxd7 Bxd7 30.Rb4 Kd6 31.Kf2 Kc5 32.Ke3 Bc6 33.h4 Rd7 34.g4 Rd8 35.g5 Rd7 36.Ke2 Rb7 37.Rxb7 Bxb7 38.cxd5 exd5 39.Ke3 Bc8 40.Kd3 Bf5+ 41.Ke3 g6 42.Nf1 Kc4 43.Ng3 d4+ 44.Kd2 Kb3 45.Ne2 Kxa3 46.Nxd4 Kb2 47.Nb5 a3 48.Nxa3 Kxa3 49.Kc3 Ka2

Related work
Alburt is the author of a series of best-selling chess books.

He served on the Board of Directors of the United States Chess Federation from 1985 to 1988. At the conclusion of his term, he stated that not once did he ever hear any discussion by the board of how to promote chess or bring new players into the game.

Alburt has worked as a chess coach for many years. In 2004, he was awarded the title of FIDE Senior Trainer. In New York City, where he lives, several Wall Street figures and other prominent people have taken chess classes from him, including Carl Icahn, Stephen Friedman, Doug Hirsch, Eliot Spitzer and Ted Field.

Books

Legacy
The Alburt Variation in Alekhine's Defence is named after him: 1.e4 Nf6 2.e5 Nd5 3.d4 d6 4.Nf3 g6.

References

External links
 
 
 

1945 births
Living people
Soviet Jews
American people of Russian-Jewish descent
Chess grandmasters
Chess coaches
Ukrainian chess players
American chess players
Jewish chess players
American chess writers
American male non-fiction writers
Soviet chess players
Soviet defectors to the United States
Odesa University alumni